James Homer "Casey" Hayes (June 16, 1906 - June 25, 1980) was an American Thoroughbred racehorse trainer whose horses won eight national Championship titles of which two were inducted in the National Museum of Racing and Hall of Fame.

A native of Brevard, North Carolina, after working with show hunters and polo ponies, Hayes greatest success came during the twenty-six years between 1943 and 1969 when he trained Thoroughbreds for flat racing for Christopher Chenery.

For Chenery, Casey Hayes conditioned horses that won more than 550 races, including the second leg of the U.S. Triple Crown series in 1950.
1949 American Champion Two-Year-Old Colt - Hill Prince
1950 American Horse of the Year - Hill Prince
1950 American Champion Three-Year-Old Male Horse - Hill Prince
1951 American Champion Older Male Horse - Hill Prince
1958 American Champion Two-Year-Old Colt 1958 - First Landing
1961 American Champion Two-Year-Old Filly - (Cicada)
1962 American Champion Three-Year-Old Filly - Cicada
1963 American Champion Older Female Horse - Cicada

Both Hill Prince and Cicada were National Museum of Racing and Hall of Fame inductees. Among others, Hayes trained Chenery's very good runners Sir Gaylord, Rich Tradition, Bryan G., and Hydrologist who, on August 2, 1969, ran third in the Monmouth Invitational Handicap which marked the last time Hayes saddled a horse for Chenery.

References

1906 births
1980 deaths
American horse trainers
People from Brevard, North Carolina